The 2016 season was the 66th season of competitive association football in China.

Promotion and relegation

National teams

China national football team

FIFA ranking

Results and fixtures

China women's national football team

FIFA ranking

Results and fixtures

AFC competitions

2016 AFC Champions League

Qualifying play-off

Preliminary round 2

|-

|}

Play-off round

|-

|}

Group stage

Group E

Group F

Group G

Group H

Knockout stage

Round of 16

|-

|}

Quarter-finals

|-

|}

Men's Football

League season

Chinese Super League

China League One

China League Two

Overall table

North Group

South Group

Play-offs

Nineteenth place match

Seventeenth Place Match

Fifteenth Place Match

Thirteenth Place Match

Eleventh Place Match

Nineteenth place match

Quarter-finals

Semi-finals

Third-Place Match

Final

Cup competitions

Chinese FA Cup

Final
First leg

Second leg

3–3 on aggregate. Guangzhou Evergrande Taobao won on away goals.

Chinese FA Super Cup

Women's Football

League season

China Women's Super League
League table

China Women's League One
League table

China Women's Super League Relegation Playoffs

Cup competitions

Chinese Women's Football Championship

Final

Chinese FA Women's Cup

Final

Chinese FA Women's Super Cup

Scandals

Wuhan Hongxing–Jiangsu Suning brawl

On 11 May 2016, an on-field brawl occurred in the third-round game of FA Cup between amateur club Wuhan Hongxing and first tier club Jiangsu Suning. Jiangsu's striker Ge Wei scored in the 7th minute of stoppage time as Jiangsu edged Wuhan Hongxing 1–0 and advanced to the next round. Players and staff of Wuhan Hongxing lost control and attacked their counterparts following the final whistle. Jiangsu's Xie Pengfei was hit onto the ground by several Wuhan players, while scorer Ge Wei was injured on his rib; many other Jiangsu's players also suffered injuries in the melee. Some reporters from Jiangsu were also assaulted in the incident. Jiangsu's staff Wu Bo, who was recording the match, was beaten up by a group of unidentified people.

Jiangsu Suning left Wuhan on a high-speed train immediately after the match. The officials of Wuhan Hongxing condemned the brawl and vowed to punish the players involved later that day. They also emphasized that the cause of the brawl could not ascribed to Wuhan only as they believed the goal celebration of Jiangsu was a deliberate provocation. On 12 May 2016, Wuhan Hongxing issued an apology to Jiangsu and announced that five players who were involved the brawl had been sacked by the club. However, Wuhan was exposed to use ineligible players in the match on the same day.

On 20 May 2016, the Chinese Football Association published the survey results and punishments. Jiangsu was awarded a 3–0 win.  Wuhan Hongxing Bairun F.C. was fined 200,000 RMB and banned from all future matches organised by the Chinese Football Association. Six players and two staff of Wuhan received a life ban from football, four players of Wuhan received a 36-month ban from football and ten players of Wuhan received a 24-month ban from football.

References

 
Seasons in Chinese football